Gora Cemetery may refer to

Gora Qabaristan, Karachi 
Gora Kabristan, Lahore
Gora Qabristan, Peshawar
Gora Kabristan, Bairana